Raúl Cascaret (20 June 1962 – 26 March 1995) was a Cuban freestyle wrestler. Cascaret was a two-time World Champion and competed in the men's freestyle 62 kg at the 1980 Summer Olympics, placing fourth. A Pan American Games champion and a seven-time Cuban National champion, Cascaret died in a car crash in 1995, at the age of 32.

References

External links
 

1962 births
1995 deaths
Cuban male sport wrestlers
Olympic wrestlers of Cuba
Wrestlers at the 1980 Summer Olympics
Sportspeople from Santiago de Cuba
Universiade gold medalists for Cuba
Universiade medalists in wrestling
Pan American Games medalists in wrestling
Pan American Games gold medalists for Cuba
Pan American Games silver medalists for Cuba
Wrestlers at the 1979 Pan American Games
Wrestlers at the 1983 Pan American Games
Wrestlers at the 1987 Pan American Games
Medalists at the 1981 Summer Universiade
Medalists at the 1979 Pan American Games
Medalists at the 1983 Pan American Games
Medalists at the 1987 Pan American Games
20th-century Cuban people